= Nawa Shah =

- Town
- Location within Pakistan
- Coordinates: 33.27°N 73.25°E
- Country: Pakistan
- Province: (Islamabad Capital Territory) Islamabad C.T
- Elevation: 642 m (2,106 ft)

Population
  - Total: 44,736
- Time zone: UTC+5 (PST)

Nawa Shah is a town in the Islamabad Capital Territory of Pakistan. It is located at 33° 27' 50N 73° 25' 45E with an altitude of 642 metres (2109 feet).
